

Events
Guiraut Riquier composes the pastorela

Births
 James II of Aragon (died 1327), a Catalan troubadour

Deaths

13th-century poetry
Poetry